Da Capo (Italian music term meaning "from the beginning") is the seventh studio album by South Korean one-man project band Toy. It was released on November 18, 2014, by Antenna Music and distributed by CJ E&M Music.

The album drew attention as various musicians collaborated with the band for the album as featured artists; Sung Si-kyung, Kim Dong-ryool, Lee Juck, Sunwoo Jung-ah, Dynamic Duo, Crush, Beenzino, Zion.T, Kwon Jin-ah, Lee Soo-hyun of Akdong Musician, and Lim Kim of Togeworl.

Da Capo has spawned two singles, the number-one hit "Three of Us" and the top 20 song "Reset". The album, co-produced by Yoo Hee-yeol (the band's sole member) and Shin Jae-pyung (of electronic duo Peppertones), is Toy's first full-length release after a seven-year hiatus since Thank You (2007).

Singles

"Three of Us"
"Three of Us", the album's lead single, is a 10-year sequel to "Good Person", which was served as the lead track for the group's fifth studio album Fermata (2001). Performed by Sung Si-kyung, this song follows the pitiful emotions of a man who has to watch the happiness of his two friends before their wedding, never expressing his love.

It was announced that actor Yoo Yeon-seok and former Miss Korea Kim Yu-mi starred in the song's music video.

Track listing

Notes
 The title of track 4 literally means "Three People".
 The title of track 5 literally means "I Stay at Your Sea".
 The title of track 12 literally means "Us".
 The title of track 13 literally means "A Drunken Night".

Chart performance

Album charts

Single charts
Three of Us

Reset

Other charted songs

Awards and nominations

Annual music awards

Music program awards

Release history

References

External links
 
 
 Toy's official website

Toy (South Korean band) albums
2014 albums
Korean-language albums
Stone Music Entertainment albums